Leo Leux (7 March 1893 – 8 September 1951) was a German composer of film scores. He began working on films during the Weimar Republic, following the introduction of sound films. During the Nazi era, Leux worked largely on entertainment films such as Truxa (1937) as well more ideogically-oriented films such as Venus on Trial (1941). He continued to work in cinema following World War II , right up to his death in 1951.

Selected filmography
 Susanne Cleans Up (1930)
 A Woman Branded (1931)
 Durand Versus Durand (1931)
 My Heart Longs for Love (1931)
 The Love Hotel (1933)
 Little Dorrit (1934)
 The Double (1934)
 The Switched Bride (1934)
 The Young Count (1935)
 His Late Excellency (1935)
 Knockout (1935)
 Maria the Maid (1936)
 The Unsuspecting Angel (1936)
 Truxa (1937)
 My Son the Minister (1937)
 The Beaver Coat (1937)
 Star of the Circus (1938)
 Robert and Bertram (1939)
 My Daughter Doesn't Do That (1940)
 Venus on Trial (1941)
 The Little Residence (1942)
 Love Letters (1944)
 Ghost in the Castle (1947)
 In the Temple of Venus (1948)
 Torreani (1951)

References

Bibliography 
 Waldman, Harry. Nazi Films In America, 1933-1942. McFarland & Company, 2008.

External links 
 

1893 births
1951 deaths
Musicians from Munich
20th-century German composers